The 2009–10 Sussex County Football League season was the 85th in the history of Sussex County Football League a football competition in England.

Division One

Division One featured 16 clubs which competed in the division last season, along with four new clubs.
Clubs promoted from Division Two:
Crawley Down
Mile Oak
Peacehaven & Telscombe
Plus:
Crowborough Athletic, relegated from the Isthmian League

Also, Chichester City United changed name to Chichester City.

League table

Division Two

Division Two featured 13 clubs which competed in the division last season, along with five new clubs.
Clubs relegated from Division One:
East Preston
Oakwood
Worthing United
Clubs promoted from Division Three:
Clymping
Little Common

League table

Division Three

Division Three featured twelve clubs which competed in the division last season, along with three new clubs:
Bexhill United, relegated from Division Two
Sidlesham, relegated from Division Two
T D Shipley, joined from the West Sussex League

League table

References

2009-10
9